Emcibacteraceae is a family of bacteria.

References

Alphaproteobacteria